Dime Savings Bank may refer to:

 Dime Savings Bank of Williamsburgh, Brooklyn
 Dime Savings Bank of New York, originally Dime Savings Bank of Brooklyn
 Dime Savings Bank of Detroit, Michigan
 Dime Savings Bank of Toledo, Ohio